Mario Gariazzo (4 June 1930 – 18 March 2002) was an Italian screenwriter and film director. He wrote for 21 films between 1969 and 1992. He also directed 18 films between 1962 and 1992. He was born in Biella, Italy and died in Rome, Italy at age 71. Gariazzo is known to horror film fans for directing The Eerie Midnight Horror Show in 1974, and White Slave in 1985. He also directed the 1978 Italian science fiction film Eyes Behind The Stars.  He worked with Klaus Kinski, Ivan Rassimov, Richard Harrison, Ray Lovelock, Martin Balsam and other genre stars.

Selected filmography
 Holy Water Joe (1971) spaghetti western starring Ty Hardin and Richard Harrison
 The Bloody Hands of the Law (1973) a.k.a. Execution Squad, a.k.a. The Law Enforcers, starring Klaus Kinski
 Last Moments (1974) starring James Whitmore and Lee J. Cobb
 The Eerie Midnight Horror Show (1974) a.k.a. The Sexorcist, starring Ivan Rassimov
 Eyes Behind the Stars (1978) a.k.a. Occhi dalle stelle, starring Martin Balsam
 Very Close Encounters of the Fourth Kind (1978)
 Play Motel (1979) starring Ray Lovelock
 White Slave (1985) a.k.a. Amazonia: The Catherine Miles Story, a.k.a. Cannibal Holocaust 2

References

External links

1930 births
2002 deaths
20th-century Italian screenwriters
Italian male screenwriters
Italian film directors
20th-century Italian male writers